Peter S. Kaufman is an American investment banker and private equity investor. He is the President and Head of Restructuring and Distressed M&A at Gordian Group LLC, an investment banking firm. He is also a Managing Partner of Bacchus Capital Management, a winery investment concern.

Early life and education
Kaufman attended the Edgemont Junior High School in Westchester County, New York and graduated from The Taft School cum laude. He attended Yale College, where he lettered in varsity lacrosse, was an editor of the Yale Daily News, and had a double major in art history and history, graduating with Honors. He was in the top quarter of his class at the University of Virginia School of Law.

Career
Kaufman practiced law in New York City before going into investment banking. Leaving the First Boston Corporation as a Vice-President, Kaufman joined Gordian Group LLC, the leading boutique investment bank specializing in distressed and/or complex financial challenges. Along with CEO Henry Furlow Owsley III, Kaufman is co-author of the definitive works in the field, Distressed Investment Banking: To The Abyss and Back - Second Edition, Beard Books 2015, Equity Holders Under Siege: Strategies and Tactics for Distressed Businesses, Beard Books LLC, 2014 and Distressed Investment Banking: To The Abyss and Back, Beard Books 2005. Both books are "must-read" for boards of directors, management teams and shareholders and/or owners of financially stressed situations, as well as for buyers and professionals. He was the founding Co-chairman of the Committee on Investment Banking of the American Bankruptcy Institute (ABI).

Kaufman serves as an Adjunct Faculty/Lecturer at the University of Virginia School of Law teaching a course entitled "Advising Boards of Directors Under Siege"; he also assists in teaching courses at University of Virginia Darden School of Business.

He is a Contributor to SportsIllustrated.com/Morning Read on golf. Kaufman had an article selected by Sports Illustrated as one of the ‘best golf reads’ in each of 2021 and 2022.  He is a member of the Metropolitan Golf Writers Association. He is also a Brand Ambassador for The Towson Watch Company.

He is perhaps the nation's most frequent commentator on national television regarding restructurings and distressed financial matters, as well as economic policy issues. He has been called the "Nastiest Man in Restructuring" by financial creditors and recognized by the media as "a top restructuring and distressed debt expert." Kaufman has appeared on, among others, Yahoo! Finance discussing the future and whether more companies will file for Chapter 11, Healthcare Bailouts and Hertz Trying to Sell Equity, the COVID-19 government bailout, Bloomberg TV, CNBC, CNN (including Anderson Cooper 360), Fox Business with Maria Bartiromo, Fox Business, NBC (Today Show) and WSJ TV, on matters relating to insolvency, corporate reorganization, federal "bailout" issues and broader stimulus and economic issues, including General Motors (GM), Chrysler and British Petroleum (BP), American Airlines & Hostess Brands, as well as municipal and state insolvency issues. He also discusses private equity on television and elsewhere. He is often cited in leading publications and international news sources such as The New York Times, The Wall Street Journal and Reuters, and was the subject of a Bloomberg feature.

Kaufman's investment banking practice primarily encompasses advising Boards of Directors, private equity firms, and buyers and sellers of distressed, stressed or "story" situations. Because it does not represent creditors, Gordian is able to achieve meaningful equity recoveries in insolvent situations. In 2013, he testified in front of the ABI Commission on Bankruptcy Reform in regards to valuation. At Bacchus Capital, he is actively involved in the fund's selection and oversight of portfolio company wineries.

Representative engagements where Kaufman led or co-led the matter include: Alexander Gallo Holdings (debtor), Alphatec (debtor), American Airlines (TWU - Mechanics Union), Enron, Jobson Healthcare (Private Equity), Lee Enterprises (Private Equity), Madoff Bankruptcy (Trustee), Mendocino Brewing, Metalico (debtor), ModSpace, MolyCorp (expert witness engagement for counsel), Montreal, Maine & Atlantic Railroad (debtor), Nuo Therapeutics (debtor), Spansion (debtor), Strata, Trans Energy (debtor), Vivaro and Xtreme Power (debtor).

Professional recognition

Peter Kaufman and his work have been featured in Bloomberg News.

In The Deal financial restructuring league tables, Kaufman is consistently named one of the country's top 10 restructuring investment bankers, and has been ranked #1.

The industry organization, M&A Advisor awarded Gordian Group LLC as Boutique Investment Bank of the Year award for the seventh time in nine years. Gordian Group was named a winner for the Out-Of-Court Restructuring of the Year (Over $100MM): Restructuring and Sale of Trans Energy, Inc.; and Cross-Border Restructuring Deal of the Year (Under $1B): Cross-Border Restructuring of Alphatec. It also awarded Gordian on behalf of their restructurings of Jobson Medical Holdings (Professional Services category) and Elyria Foundry (Industrial, Manufacturing & Distribution category). In 2014, the University of Virginia awarded him an honorary appointment as a Visiting Executive Lecturer at the Darden Graduate School of Business Administration.

Kaufman was honored with the 2015 M&A Advisor Leadership Award for his contribution to and accomplishments in the industry at the 9th Annual Turnaround Awards Gala in Palm Beach, FL. Later that year, Kaufman was inducted into the M&A Advisor Hall of Fame at the 14th Annual M&A Advisor Awards Gala in New York City.

Personal life
Kaufman grew up, and lives, in Westchester County, New York.  He is also an owner on Chebeague Island, Maine.  He has two daughters.

Publications
 Co-author, "Warnings Persist for Corporate Directors Evaluating LBO and Other Multi-Step Transactions" (Harvard Law School Forum on Corporate Governance, July 21, 2021) https://corpgov.law.harvard.edu/2021/07/21/warnings-persist-for-corporate-directors-evaluating-lbo-and-other-multi-step-transactions/
 Co-author, Distressed Investment Banking: To the Abyss and Back - Second Edition(Frederick, Md.: Beard Books, 2015)
 Co-author, Equity Holders under Siege: Strategies and Tactics for Distressed Businesses.(Frederick, Md.: Beard Books, 2014)
 Co-author, Distressed Investment Banking: To the Abyss and Back.(Frederick, Md.: Beard Books LLC, 2005)
 Co-author, "The Role of the Investment Banker," in Bankruptcy Business Acquisitions (New York: Lex Med Publishing, 1998)
 Co-author, "Trading in the Distressed Market," in Investing in Bankruptcies and Turnarounds (New York: HarperCollins Publishers, 1991)

See also
 University of Virginia School of Law
 Yale University
 Taft School

References

University of Virginia School of Law alumni
Living people
Yale College alumni
Taft School alumni
Businesspeople from New York City
American bankers
Bankruptcy
Year of birth missing (living people)